Pamphagus is a genus of grasshoppers in the family Pamphagidae. There are about 12 described species in Pamphagus, found in southern Europe and northern Africa.

Species
These 12 species belong to the genus Pamphagus:

 Pamphagus auresianus Massa, 1992
 Pamphagus batnensis Benkenana & Petit, 2012
 Pamphagus caprai Massa, 1992
 Pamphagus cristatus Descamps & Mounassif, 1972
 Pamphagus djelfensis Vosseler, 1902
 Pamphagus elephas (Linnaeus, 1758)
 Pamphagus marmoratus Burmeister, 1838
 Pamphagus meridionalis Descamps & Mounassif, 1972
 Pamphagus milevitanus Benkenana & Massa, 2017
 Pamphagus ortolaniae Cusimano & Massa, 1977
 Pamphagus sardeus (Herrich-Schäffer, 1840)
 Pamphagus tunetanus Vosseler, 1902

References

Pamphagidae
Orthoptera genera